Psalm 31 is the 31st psalm of the Book of Psalms, beginning in English in the King James Version: "In thee, O , do I put my trust". In Latin, it is known as "In te Domine speravi". The Book of Psalms is part of the third section of the Hebrew Bible, and a book of the Christian Old Testament. In the slightly different numbering system used in the Greek Septuagint version of the Bible, and in its Latin translation, the Vulgate, this psalm is Psalm 30.  The first verse in the Hebrew text indicates that it was composed by David.

The psalm forms a regular part of Jewish, Catholic, Lutheran, Anglican and other Protestant liturgies. Metrical hymns in English and German were derived from the psalm, such as "In dich hab ich gehoffet, Herr" and "Blest be the name of Jacob's God". The psalm has often been set to music, both completely and using specific sections such as "Illumina faciem tuam" (Make thy face to shine). Vocal settings were written by Johann Crüger, Heinrich Schütz, Joseph Haydn, and Felix Mendelssohn, among others.

"Into thine hand I commit my spirit" were the last words of many Christian figures, including Jesus, Saint Bernard, Jerome of Prague, and Martin Luther. "My times are in Thy hand" also became a frequently quoted phrase.

Background and themes
The author of the psalm is identified by the first verse in the Hebrew, "To the chief musician, a song of David". It was likely written while David was fleeing from Saul. On the basis of the wording of the Psalm, Charles and Emilie Briggs claim that "The author certainly knew Jeremiah, Isaiah, Ezekiel, and many Psalms of the Persian period. We cannot put the composition earlier than the troubles of Israel preceding the reforms of Nehemiah". The Persian period began in 539 BC, and Nehemiah's reforms are dated to about 445 BC.

In the psalm, David calls God his "rock" (which shields him from attack) and his "fortress" (which protects him on all sides). David also cites his physical ailments—"[h]is eyesight has dimmed from his troubles, and he has endured physical as well as spiritual deprivation. His life has been a continuous flow of trouble, causing him to age prematurely"—and acknowledges that these afflictions were sent by Heaven to encourage him to atone for his sins. The psalm ends on a note of hope: "The faithful should love G-d because He protects them, but He carefully repays the arrogant what they deserve".

In the New Testament, the four evangelists each cite the last words of Jesus; according to Luke the Evangelist, these last words came from verse 5 (KJV) of Psalm 31, "Into thine hand I commit my spirit". Similarly, according to nineteenth-century English Anglican bishop John James Stewart Perowne, this verse constituted the last words of many Christian figures, including Polycarp, Saint Bernard, Jerome of Prague, Martin Luther, and Philip Melanchthon. James Limburg notes that this makes the psalm suitable for preaching, and that it is often intoned at the time of death.

Text

King James Version
To the chief musician, a song of David.
In thee, O , do I put my trust; let me never be ashamed: deliver me in thy righteousness.
Bow down thine ear to me; deliver me speedily: be thou my strong rock, for an house of defence to save me.
For thou art my rock and my fortress; therefore for thy name's sake lead me, and guide me.
Pull me out of the net that they have laid privily for me: for thou art my strength.
Into thine hand I commit my spirit: thou hast redeemed me, O  God of truth.
I will be glad and rejoice in thy mercy: for thou hast considered my trouble; thou hast known my soul in adversities;
And hast not shut me up into the hand of the enemy: thou hast set my feet in a large room.
Have mercy upon me, O LORD, for I am in trouble: mine eye is consumed with grief, yea, my soul and my belly.
For my life is spent with grief, and my years with sighing: my strength faileth because of mine iniquity, and my bones are consumed.
I was a reproach among all mine enemies, but especially among my neighbours, and a fear to mine acquaintance: they that did see me without fled from me.
I am forgotten as a dead man out of mind: I am like a broken vessel.
For I have heard the slander of many: fear was on every side: while they took counsel together against me, they devised to take away my life.
But I trusted in thee, O : I said, Thou art my God. 
My times are in thy hand: deliver me from the hand of mine enemies, and from them that persecute me.
Make thy face to shine upon thy servant: save me for thy mercies' sake.
Let me not be ashamed, O ; for I have called upon thee: let the wicked be ashamed, and let them be silent in the grave.
Let the lying lips be put to silence; which speak grievous things proudly and contemptuously against the righteous.
Oh how great is thy goodness, which thou hast laid up for them that fear thee; which thou hast wrought for them that trust in thee before the sons of men!
Thou shalt hide them in the secret of thy presence from the pride of man: thou shalt keep them secretly in a pavilion from the strife of tongues.
Blessed be the : for he hath shewed me his marvellous kindness in a strong city.
For I said in my haste, I am cut off from before thine eyes: nevertheless thou heardest the voice of my supplications when I cried unto thee.

Uses

Judaism
Verse 6 (in the Hebrew) is part of Baruch Adonai L'Olam in the evening prayer. It is also part of the Bedtime Shema. The phrase be-yado afkid ruchi ("Into his hand I commit my spirit")  starts the last verse of Adon Olam.

Verses 15 and 17 are included in the preliminary morning prayers.

Verse 20 is one of the verses said after learning Mishnayos for a deceased person.

In the Siddur Sfas Emes, this psalm is said as a prayer for the well-being of an ailing person.

Tanakh
Verses 2–4 (in the Hebrew) are also the first 3 verses of Psalm 71.

New Testament

Saint Stephen prays a similar but modified version of Psalm 31:6 in Acts 5:59 "Lord Jesus receive my spirit". Stephen also prays for forgiveness for those causing his death, as Jesus did.

Catholic
The first line of the Psalm in Latin, "In te Domine speravi", became the final line of the Te Deum, which has often been set to music. Verses 15 and 16, "Illumina faciem tuam" (Make thy face to shine), is a communion verse for Septuagesima.

Protestant 

Adam Reusner wrote a rhymed paraphrase of the first six verses of Psalm 31, "" ("literally: "For you I have hoped, Lord") as a Psalmlied, a song in the native language to be sung in place of the Latin psalm recitation in the former church, published in 1533. It was translated to English in several versions, including "In Thee, Lord, have I put my trust" by Catherine Winkworth.

In the Church of England's Book of Common Prayer, this psalm is appointed to be read on the morning of the sixth day of the month. Verses 1 to 5 are used in the Church of England's Office of Night Prayer (Compline).

Other 
Verse 15 (KJV), "My times are in Thy hand", became a frequently quoted phrase. A hymn with the title "My times are in thy hand" by William Freeman Lloyd was published in 1873. In 1891, the preacher Charles Haddon Spurgeon based an essay on the thought. In a 2013 article in the German weekly Die Zeit, Margot Käßmann quoted "Meine Zeit steht in deinen Händen" as a call to see that a lifetime is a gift, and of unknown duration, to be used responsibly in free decision, for the community.

Musical settings

Classical
Heinrich Isaac composed a setting of verses 15 and 16, "Illumina faciem tuam" for four-part choir, published in Choralis Constantinus in 1550.
Carlo Gesualdo composed a setting of these verses for five-part choir (SATTB), published in his Sacrae cantiones in 1603.

Hans Leo Hassler composed a setting of the complete psalm in Latin for three four-part choirs, published in Sacrae Symphoniae in 1598.Heinrich Schütz set the same hymn in the Becker Psalter, SWV 128, published in 1628. He set the complete psalm in Latin for solo voice and instruments, published in Symphoniae sacrae in 1629.  In 1648, Johann Rosenmüller published a setting of the first six verses in Latin for two sopranos and two tenors, two violins and continuo, in Kern-Sprüche. In te Domine speravi (Johann Rosenmüller) Johann Crüger set the German rhymed version, "In dich hab ich gehoffet, Herr", for four-part choir with optional instruments, published in 1649. In 1699, Marc-Antoine Charpentier composed 3e psalm du 1er nocturne du Mercredi saint, for soloists, chorus, strings and bc, H.228.

Joseph Haydn set three verses from a rhymed paraphrase in English by James Merrick, "Blest be the name of Jacob's God", for three voices, which was first published in 1794 in Improved Psalmody. Felix Mendelssohn set Psalm 31 to music a capella in English using the King James Version. Arthur Sullivan wrote an anthem for four voices and organ, setting the final two verses, "O love the Lord", first published in 1864.

Contemporary
Contemporary compositions which incorporate verses from Psalm 31 include "Two Sacred Songs" (1964) for voice and piano by Robert Starer, "In Thee O Lord Do I Put My Trust" (1964) by Jan Bender, and "Blessed be the Lord" (1973), an introit and anthem by Nancy Lupo.

In the 21st century, Nobuaki Izawa set "Illumina faciem tuam" as a four-part motet, published in 2016. The Salisbury Cathedral Choir sang Psalm 31, with music composed by Walter Alcock, Richard Shephard, and Charles Frederick South, for a 2012 recording. The Psalms Project released its musical composition of Psalm 31 on the fourth volume of its album series in 2019.

Notes

References

Bibliography

External links 

 
 
 Psalms Chapter 31 text in Hebrew and English, mechon-mamre.org
 For the leader. A psalm of David. / In you, LORD, I take refuge; let me never be put to shame. text and footnotes, usccb.org United States Conference of Catholic Bishops
 Psalm 31 / Refrain: Into your hands I commend my spirit. Church of England
 Psalm 31 at biblegateway.com
 Hymns for Psalm 31 hymnary.org

6th-century BC literature
5th-century BC literature
031
Works attributed to David